Iwakaze Kakutaro (born Yoshikazu Okamoto; January 22, 1934 – April 30, 1988) was a sumo wrestler from Tokyo, Japan. He made his professional debut in May 1952 and reached the top division in May 1956. His highest rank was sekiwake. He retired from active competition in September 1965.

Pre-modern career record
 In 1953 the New Year tournament was begun and the Spring tournament began to be held in Osaka.

Modern career record
Since the addition of the Kyushu tournament in 1957 and the Nagoya tournament in 1958, the yearly schedule has remained unchanged.

See also
Glossary of sumo terms
List of past sumo wrestlers
List of sumo tournament top division runners-up
List of sumo tournament second division champions
List of sekiwake

References

1934 births
Japanese sumo wrestlers
Sumo people from Tokyo
Sekiwake
1988 deaths